Liberal Kemalism is a converge between Kemalism, the founding ideology of the Republic of Turkey, and the idea of liberalism, which is based on liberty. It's also called Neo-Kemalism.

Liberal Kemalism is a synthesis of classical liberalism and Kemalism. It was created by Ahmet Ağaoğlu in 1930s, who was previously a nationalist person.

Most Liberal Kemalists support Kemalist ideas such as secularism, republicanism, and reformism.

Social opinion 

Liberal Kemalism defends Atatürk's understanding of nationalism in the social sphere. It is the concept of nationalism, which is also stated in Article 88 of the 1924 Constitution and Atatürk's six principles, and which bases the definition of nation on cultural and political unity, regardless of religion or race.

Liberal Kemalism, just like Kemalism argues that it is necessary to give everyone freedom of conscience, faith and thought.

Economic opinion 

Liberal Kemalism advocates a free market economy with social government policies and enough regulation to guarantee a fair market, similar to Atatürk's statism. Free market is a system in which the prices for goods and services are self-regulated by buyers and sellers negotiating in an open market.

History 

Liberal Kemalism emerged in the early periods of the republic in Turkey as a result of the interpretation of Kemalist thought from a liberal point of view by Ahmet Ağaoğlu. Ağaoğlu described himself as "Reformist and Kemalist" on the one hand, while trying to develop a "Liberal Kemalism" idea. Ağaoğlu, an advocate of individual freedoms within the Republican People's Party, criticized some of the party's policies. Later, Ağaoğlu moved away from CHF with his liberal-based ideas and joined the Liberal Republican Party at Atatürk's request and was described as one of the most important figures in the SCF, even the ideologue of the party. He did not return to CHF after the Liberal Republican Party closed.

It is seen that the understanding of individualism has an important place in the thought and political life of Ahmet Ağaoğlu, who is one of the important representatives of the enlightened politician model, which was widely seen in the first years of the Turkish Republic. He evaluates his views on modernization, society, democracy, freedom and economy within the framework of individualism. Considering the general political atmosphere both in the country and in the world, it is clear that Ağaoğlu's approach is quite exceptional. In these years when liberalism lost its credibility in the intellectual and political circles, Ağaoğlu insistently advocates that political, economic and social liberal principles should be taken as a basis in order for the new state to survive and develop in a strong and healthy way.

See also 
 Kemalism
 Liberalism
 Free market economy

References

Further reading

Kemalism
Liberalism